The name Gwen has been used for seven tropical cyclones worldwide: four in the Eastern Pacific Ocean, one in the Western Pacific Ocean, and two in the Australian region.

In the Atlantic:
 Tropical Depression Gwen (1960)
 Tropical Storm Gwen (1968)
 Hurricane Gwen (1972) – Category 3 hurricane, made landfall north of San Diego, California, as a depression
 Tropical Storm Gwen (1976) – remained over the open ocean

In the Western Pacific:
 Typhoon Gwen (1947) (T4707)

In the Australian region:
 Cyclone Gwen (1967)
 Cyclone Gwen (1978)

Pacific hurricane set index articles
Pacific typhoon set index articles
Australian region cyclone set index articles